Arfon Williams (born 1958) is a Welsh Anglican priest.

Williams was educated at Aberystwyth University and Wycliffe Hall Oxford. After a curacy in Carmarthen he held Incumbencies in Aberystwyth and 
. He was Archdeacon of Merioneth from 2002 until 2004; and has been Dean of Elphin and Ardagh since then.

References

Bethesda
20th-century Welsh Anglican priests
21st-century Welsh Anglican priests
1958 births
Living people
Archdeacons of Merioneth
Deans of Elphin and Ardagh
Alumni of Aberystwyth University
Alumni of Wycliffe Hall, Oxford